Bryopsis africana is a species of green alga from South Africa. It is given the common name sea moss.

References

Plants described in 1851
Flora of South Africa
Bryopsidales